The 2013–14 Loyola Ramblers men's basketball team represented Loyola University Chicago during the 2013–14 NCAA Division I men's basketball season. The Ramblers, led by third year head coach Porter Moser, played their home games at the Joseph J. Gentile Arena and were first year members of the Missouri Valley Conference. They finished the season 10–22, 4–14 in MVC play to finish in last place. They advanced to the quarterfinals of the Missouri Valley tournament where they lost to Indiana State.

Roster

Schedule

|-
!colspan=9 style="background:#800000; color:#D4AF37;"| Exhibition

|-
!colspan=9 style="background:#800000; color:#D4AF37;"| Regular season

|-
!colspan=9 style="background:#800000; color:#D4AF37;"| 2014 Missouri Valley tournament

References

Loyola Ramblers men's basketball seasons
Loyola
Loyola Ramblers
Loyola Ramblers